Emilee Anderson (born December 13, 1995) is an American ski jumper who has been competing since 2011.  She  participated at the 2012 Winter Youth Olympics.

References

External links
 Emilee Anderson on FIS
 

1995 births
American female ski jumpers
Living people
Ski jumpers at the 2012 Winter Youth Olympics
21st-century American women